Taoufik Bouachrine (born 1969, Meknes) is a Moroccan journalist and editor.

In 2005 he was editor-in-chief of al-Jarida al-Oukhra which was founded by Ali Anouzla and was banned in 2006. In September 2006, he co-founded the popular daily al-Massae with Rachid Ninni.

Bouachrine holds a master's degree in political science from the Mohammed V University of Rabat, which he obtained in 1997.

See also
Ali Anouzla
Aboubakr Jamai

References

1969 births
People from Meknes
Moroccan male journalists
Moroccan newspaper editors
Mohammed V University alumni
Living people
Moroccan magazine editors